Rebecca Bishop may refer to:

Rebecca Bishop, fictional character in A Discovery of Witches and Shadow of Night
Rebecca Bishop, fictional character in Prototype (TV film)